Dalamgiri was one of the 60 assembly constituencies of Meghalaya, a north-east state of India. It was also part of Tura (Lok Sabha constituency). Dalamgiri was made defunct by the Delimitation of Parliamentary and Assembly Constituencies Order, 2008.

Member of Legislative Assembly

 1972: Ira Marak, All Party Hill Leaders Conference
 1978: Armison Marak, All Party Hill Leaders Conference
 1983: Ira Marak, Indian National Congress
 1988: Admiral K. Sangma, Indian National Congress
 1993: Admiral K. Sangma, Indian National Congress
 1998: Admiral K. Sangma, Indian National Congress
 2003: Admiral K. Sangma, Nationalist Congress Party
 2008: Saleng Sangma, Nationalist Congress Party

See also
 West Garo Hills district
 Tura (Lok Sabha constituency)

References

Former assembly constituencies of Meghalaya
West Garo Hills district